Kittu Unnadu Jagratha (English: Kittu is there, beware) is a 2017 Indian Telugu comedy thriller film directed by Vamsi Krishna and written by Srikanth Vissa. It starred Raj Tarun and Anu Emmanuel in the lead roles, along with Arbaaz Khan playing the antagonist. The music is by Anup Rubens. The film has completed censor board formalities and released on 3 March 2017.

Plot 
Kittu is a mechanical engineer who runs a car garage with his friends. He also kidnaps dogs and ask ransom money from the owners to set their dogs free. Kittu is in debts and has to pay money from a moneylender. When he and his friends gets caught, Kittu reveals his past to the moneylender:

Kittu met Janaki where he falls in love and pursue her to accept him, She recropriates and they began a relationship. However, the bag is stolen by his friend Babji. So, he and his friends had borrowed some money from the moneylender and also kidnaps dogs from the household for ransom in order to pay Janaki's debt. When Janaki finds out from her friend (whose dog was also kidnapped by Kittu), She breaks up with him. 

AIR is a businessman and also an expert blackmailer who blackmails a CBI officer to stop investigating cricketer Prashanth Varma's death, who was also blackmailed by AIR for matchfixing. An IT raid occurs at his house headed by IT commissioner Aditya Narayan where he takes AIR's safe box which contains evidences of his blackmailed victims. He learns from Rishi, who is the mole in IT department that the safe is in  IT headquarters safe and the IT access card can open the safe. He tells his brother Bhadra to kidnap Aditya Narayan's daughter. 

Meanwhile, Janaki learns that Kittu was actually extorting money to pay off her debts. She calls him to arrive at a park for a chat. Kittu and his friends kidnap a dog which turns out to be Janaki's dog, but is kidnapped by Bhadra, only to learn that Janaki is Aditya Narayan's daughter. Bhadra demands Aditya Narayan for access card and also for  crore for his expenses. 

The SI begans the investigation only to apprehend Kittu and his friends where Kittu learns of Janaki's kidnapping. 

The SI takes them to a forest to kill them, but the gun's bullets were removed by Kittu due to sudden brake in the car and they escape from the SI. Kittu and his friends decide to save Janaki where they steal Nimasi Baba/Santhanam's car and also learn about AIR's profession from Nimasi Baba/Santhanam as a blackmailer when they retrieve access car from the garage and also knocking Bhadra when he arrived at the garage to find the card. 

The SI arrives at the garage where a shootout ensues. Kittu and his friend takes the car and drive towards the IT headquarters to steal the safe, they knock out Rishi where AIR calls Kittu to arrive at his hideout when AIR learns from Bhadra that Kittu has the safe. Kittu reunites with Janaki where AIR ask him about the safe. However, The moneylender and his henchman arrive at the hideout to apparend Kittu. 

However, Kittu mixes up everything and a shootout ensues. Kittu learns from Janaki that the money (which Janaki left in the car) was fake as Aditya Narayan learnt about Kittu and wanted to test his honesty and love for Janaki. They patch up and escape from the hideout where the SI tries to apparend Kittu, but Janaki interferes and tells them about AIR, but is forced to release AIR as he blackmailed the CBI officer to release him. 

The police leave the hideout where AIR holds Kittu and his friends at gunpoint and demands the safe, but Kittu peppersprays him with Pedigree meat spray and lets the howl of dogs to charge towards AIR. The next day, Kittu meets up with AIR in a mental asylum, where he makes him pretend to be mentally ill due to the dog bites and makes him to stay as mentally ill for his misdeeds. 

In a park, Kittu and Janaki meets up where he kisses her without her consent, due to which Janaki funnily chases Kittu.

Cast

Soundtrack
The Music Was Composed By Anup Rubens and Released by Aditya Music.

Marketing 
The first poster of the film was unveiled on 29 October 2016 on the eve of Diwali. A teaser for the film was released on 1 January 2017 on the eve of New Year.

Release
The movie released on 3 March 2017 across Telangana and Andhra Pradesh.

Boxoffice

Overseas
The film was a box office hit and beat  other new releases Dwaraka and Gunturodu  at the box office Tollystar gave it a rating 3/5 saying Kittu Unnadu Jagratha had its funny moments that can entertain audience and is a nice time pass movie

References 

2010s Telugu-language films
Indian action comedy films
Films scored by Anoop Rubens
2017 films
2017 directorial debut films
2017 action comedy films